German submarine U-618 was a Type VIIC U-boat built for Nazi Germany's Kriegsmarine for service during World War II.
She was laid down on 29 May 1941 by Blohm & Voss, Hamburg as yard number 594, launched on 20 February 1942 and commissioned on 16 April 1942 under Oberleutnant zur See Kurt Baberg.

Design
German Type VIIC submarines were preceded by the shorter Type VIIB submarines. U-618 had a displacement of  when at the surface and  while submerged. She had two shafts and two  propellers.

U-618 was fitted with five  torpedo tubes (four fitted at the bow and one at the stern), fourteen torpedoes, one  SK C/35 naval gun, 220 rounds, and a  C/30 anti-aircraft gun. The boat had a complement of between forty-four and sixty.

Service history
The boat's career began with training at 5th U-boat Flotilla on 16 April 1942, followed by active service on 1 September 1942 as part of the 7th Flotilla for the remainder of her service.

1943
On 20 November 1943, U-618 shot down a RAF Liberator bomber of 53 Squadron near to Convoy SL 139.

On 30 December 1943, U-618 rescued 21 survivors from German destroyer Z27. and its escort.

1944
On 19 March 1944, U-618, while trying to enter the Mediterranean Sea, sustained a week long sustained Allied attack from both aircraft and surface ships before being forced to return to France with heavy battle damage.

On 6 April 1944, U-618 was attacked by a RCAF Liberator bomber. She was able to return fire and damage the aircraft sufficiently that the air attack was broken off.

On 30 July 1944, U-618 shot down a RAF Wellington bomber in the Bay of Biscay. All six of the aircrew were killed when the bomber crashed into the sea.

Fate
All hands were lost.

Wolfpacks
U-618 took part in 18 wolfpacks, namely:
 Pfeil (12 – 22 September 1942)
 Blitz (22 – 26 September 1942)
 Tiger (26 – 30 September 1942)
 Wotan (5 – 19 October 1942)
 Neuland (4 – 6 March 1943)
 Ostmark (6 – 11 March 1943)
 Stürmer (11 – 20 March 1943)
 Seewolf (21 – 30 March 1943)
 Adler (11 – 13 April 1943)
 Meise (13 – 20 April 1943)
 Specht (21 – 25 April 1943)
 Schill 3 (18 – 22 November 1943)
 Weddigen (22 November – 7 December 1943)
 Coronel (7 – 8 December 1943)
 Coronel 2 (8 – 14 December 1943)
 Coronel 3 (14 – 17 December 1943)
 Borkum (18 – 26 December 1943)
 Hela (28 December 1943 – 1 January 1944)

Summary of raiding history

See also
 Convoy SC 104

References

Bibliography

External links

German Type VIIC submarines
1942 ships
U-boats commissioned in 1942
Ships lost with all hands
U-boats sunk in 1944
U-boats sunk by British aircraft
U-boats sunk by depth charges
U-boats sunk by British warships
World War II shipwrecks in the Atlantic Ocean
World War II submarines of Germany
Ships built in Hamburg
Maritime incidents in August 1944